The following lists events that happened during 1900 in Australia.

Incumbents
Monarch – Queen Victoria
Note: Australia was not yet federalized in 1900, therefore no prime minister existed.

Governors of the Australian colonies
Governor of New South Wales – William Lygon, 7th Earl Beauchamp
Governor of Queensland – Charles Cochrane-Baillie, 2nd Baron Lamington
Governor of South Australia – Hallam Tennyson, 2nd Baron Tennyson
Governor of Tasmania – Jenico Preston, 14th Viscount Gormanston (until 14 August)
Governor of Victoria – Thomas Brassey, 1st Earl Brassey (until 31 March)
Premier of New South Wales – William Lyne
Premier of South Australia – Frederick Holder
Premier of Queensland – Robert Philp
Premier of Tasmania – Elliott Lewis
Premier of Western Australia – John Forrest
Premier of Victoria – Allan McLean (until 19 November), then George Turner

Events
3 January – Electric lighting is installed on Adelaide streets.
25 January – State Labour politicians meet in Sydney to formally found the federal Labour party.
25 March – The S.S. Glenelg is wrecked off the Victorian coast, resulting in 31 deaths.
March to May – Record rainfall and flooding affect the Pilbara and Gascoyne regions of Western Australia
9 May – The Sierra Nevada is wrecked off Portsea, Victoria; 23 lives are lost.
2 July – Snow falls to extremely low levels in New South Wales, being recorded as low as Forbes.
5 July – The Commonwealth of Australia Constitution Act (UK) is passed.
24 July – Neville Howse rescues a fallen ally under heavy fire during the Second Boer War, becoming the first Australian recipient of the Victoria Cross.
8 August – The first Australian contingents of naval volunteers set sail for China to assist British and international troops during the Boxer Rebellion.
17 October – Natural gas is found at Roma in Queensland
27 October – Notorious murderer Jimmy Governor is apprehended near Wingham, New South Wales.
15 December – Upon his arrival in Australia, the first Governor-General, Lord Hopetoun, commits the so-called Hopetoun Blunder.

Film
14 September – The film Soldiers of the Cross is shown in Melbourne, one of the first films shown in Australia. (IMDb entry)

Literature

Births
 8 January – Merlyn Myer, Australian philanthropist (d. 1982)
 25 January – Harold Raggatt, public servant (died 1968)
 29 March – John McEwen, caretaker Prime Minister (1967–1968) (died 1980)
 9 October – Frank O'Grady, Australian public servant (d. 1981)
 19 October – Bill Ponsford, cricketer (died 1991)
 20 October – Jack Lindsay, writer (died 1990)
 3 December – Albert Hawke, Premier of Western Australia (1953–1959) (died 1989)

Deaths
17 July – Thomas McIlwraith, former Queensland premier (born 1835)
17 November – John Ferris, Australian cricketer (born 1867)

Population

  About 4, 000, 000

See also
 List of Australian films before 1910

References

 
Australia
Years of the 19th century in Australia
1900s in Australia
Australia
Australia